Kaiyne River Woolery (born 11 January 1995) is an English professional footballer who plays as a winger for Super League Greece club Ionikos.

Career

Early years
Woolery was signed by Conference Premier team Tamworth from Isthmian League club Maidstone United in June 2013. He was loaned to Stafford Rangers of the Northern Premier League at the start of the 2013–14 season. He was loaned back to Maidstone in January 2014 for a two-month spell.

Bolton Wanderers
He joined Championship club Bolton Wanderers in August 2014 for a £10,000 fee. He was sent out on loan to League One side Notts County in January 2015.

He made his Bolton debut as a substitute for Adam Le Fondre when Wanderers lost 3–0 to the eventual Champions Bournemouth on 27 April 2015.
On 6 February 2016, Woolery scored his first senior goal for Bolton, a 93rd-minute winner against Rotherham United.

Wigan Athletic
Woolery joined Wigan Athletic on 31 August 2016 and was given the number 18 shirt. He made his debut for the Latics on 3 December 2016, when he came on as a substitute for Max Power in the 86th minute in a 1–0 loss to Derby County.

On 21 January 2017 it was announced that Woolery had signed for National League side Forest Green Rovers on loan until the end of the season. He made his debut for Forest Green on the same day of his signing, coming on as a substitute for Keanu Marsh-Brown in a 1–1 draw with Braintree Town. Woolery went on to score twice for FGR at Wembley in the 2017 National league play-off final.

Swindon Town
On 7 August 2017, Woolery joined League Two side Swindon Town on a three-year deal for a £350,000 fee.
After coming on as a half-time substitute, he scored an equaliser against Exeter City on his Swindon Town debut at the County Ground on 12 August 2017. After a fairly inconsistent first season for Swindon Town, he got injured in April in a home match against Yeovil Town. This injury ruled him out for the rest of the 2017/18 season and the first 2 months of the 2018/19 season. He made his return on 9 October 2018, coming on as a second half sub in an EFL Trophy group stage match against Plymouth Argyle and scoring within ten minutes.

Tranmere Rovers
On 14 September 2020, Woolery joined League Two side Tranmere Rovers on a free transfer. He scored his first goal for Tranmere in an EFL Trophy tie against Wigan Athletic on 11 November 2020.

Motherwell
On 22 June 2021, Woolery signed for Scottish Premiership side Motherwell on a three-year contract, with the manager Graham Alexander quoted as saying, "Kaiyne is a player I’ve admired for a few years now". On 14 July 2022, Motherwell announced that Woolery had left the club to join TFF First League club Sakaryaspor for an undisclosed fee.

In January 2023, Woolery joined Super League Greece side Ionikos on a free transfer.

Career statistics

Honours
Swindon Town
EFL League Two: 2019–20

Tranmere Rovers
EFL Trophy runner-up: 2020–21

References

External links

1995 births
Living people
Footballers from Hackney, London
English footballers
Redhill F.C. players
Maidstone United F.C. players
Tamworth F.C. players
Stafford Rangers F.C. players
Bolton Wanderers F.C. players
Notts County F.C. players
Wigan Athletic F.C. players
Forest Green Rovers F.C. players
Swindon Town F.C. players
Tranmere Rovers F.C. players
Motherwell F.C. players
Isthmian League players
National League (English football) players
Northern Premier League players
English Football League players
Scottish Professional Football League players
English expatriate footballers
Sakaryaspor footballers
Ionikos F.C. players
Expatriate footballers in Turkey
Expatriate footballers in Greece
English expatriate sportspeople in Turkey
English expatriate sportspeople in Greece
Super League Greece players
TFF First League players
Association football wingers